Rustlers of the Badlands is a 1945 American Western film directed by Derwin Abrahams and starring Charles Starrett, Carla Balenda and Dub Taylor.

Cast
 Charles Starrett as Steve Lindsay / The Durango Kid 
 Tex Harding as Tex Harding 
 Dub Taylor as Cannonball
 Carla Balenda as Sally Boylston 
 George Eldredge as Jim Norton 
 Edward Howard as Henchman Regan  
 Karl Hackett as Sheriff Mallory 
 James T. 'Bud' Nelson as Henchman 
 Frank McCarroll as Henchman 
 Carl Sepulveda as Henchman

References

Bibliography
 Bernard A. Drew. Motion Picture Series and Sequels: A Reference Guide. Routledge, 2013.

External links
 

1945 films
1945 Western (genre) films
American Western (genre) films
Films directed by Derwin Abrahams
Columbia Pictures films
American black-and-white films
1940s English-language films
1940s American films